Madeleine Kate Hayley Hill (born 19 March 1990) is an English actress, known for her roles as Nancy Carter in the BBC soap opera EastEnders and Ruby Spark in the BBC medical drama Casualty.

Career
Hill trained at Rose Bruford College drama school. Her first credited acting role was a two episode guest appearance in ITV drama Whitechapel during the third series. She then appeared as a checkout girl in the 2013 film uwantme2killhim? and in the stage productions of As You Like it and The Meeting Place as Phoebe and George respectively.

In October 2013, it was announced that Danny Dyer and Kellie Bright had been cast as Mick and Linda Carter and that they would be taking over The Queen Victoria pub. At the end of the month, it was announced that Mick and Linda's children, Nancy and Johnny, would be played by Hill and Sam Strike respectively. Speaking of her casting Hill said; "I feel incredibly privileged to have been given such an amazing opportunity and I can't wait to start work with such a talented cohort of actors." In 2016, Hill took part in a celebrity version of The Great British Bake Off in aid of Sport Relief. In January 2018, Hill was cast in the BBC medical drama series Casualty as Ruby Spark, a paramedic. Hill began filming in February and her first episode was broadcast on 14 July 2018. In 2020, she departed from her role, with her final scenes airing on 18 April 2020. In February 2021, it was announced that she would be reprising her role of Nancy in EastEnders later in the year.

Filmography

Stage

Awards and nominations

References

External links 
 
 
 

1990 births
21st-century English actresses
Actresses from London
English soap opera actresses
Alumni of Rose Bruford College
English television actresses
Living people
People from the London Borough of Hackney